The Atlanta and Birmingham Air Line Railway (A&BAL) was formed when the Seaboard Air Line Railroad (SAL) purchased the capital stock of the bankrupt East and West Railroad of Alabama (E&W) on April 23, 1902. The E&W Railroad had already established a line from Cartersville, Georgia, to Pell City, Alabama, through the cities of Rockmart, Georgia, Cedartown, Georgia, and Piedmont, Alabama.

The SAL then merged the E&W into a new subsidiary called the Atlanta and Birmingham Air Line Railway. With this new subsidiary, a 37-mile extension was built from Coal City, Alabama (renamed to Wattsville in 1917)  to Birmingham, AL. In addition, a 43-mile connection from Howells, Georgia (located in Northwest Atlanta) was constructed to meet the former E&W at Rockmart.

Some of the sights on the line include the Pumpkinvine Creek Trestle located in Paulding County, Georgia, which was built in 1901 by the E&W and is 126 feet high and 750 feet long. Because of the mountainous terrain in Alabama, 3 tunnels were constructed on this line. At the time, SAL had no tunnels anywhere on their entire system. The tunnels constructed were the Divide Tunnel (now called Bushy Mountain Tunnel) located near Braswell, Georgia, the Hardwick Tunnel located between Odenville and Wattsville, Alabama, and the Roper Tunnel located near Trussville, Alabama. The 3 tunnels totaled 2,964 ft. in length. Currently, the Hardwick and Roper tunnels are being used by the Alabama and Tennessee River Railway, a subsidiary railroad of OmniTRAX.

In 1904 the A&BAL reached Birmingham where it interchanged with the Louisville & Nashville Railroad (L&N), the St. Louis–San Francisco Railway (Frisco) and the Illinois Central Railroad (IC). The A&BAL also reached Howells (located in Northwest Atlanta), which became the location of the Seaboard Georgia Division offices, and a switching yard and Locomotive servicing and repair shop. After the A&BAL opened in late 1904, the 22-mile Rockmart-Cartersville link and the Coal City-Pell City tracks became branches off the main line. The line officially opened for freight traffic on December 5, 1904, and passenger service July 2, 1905.

SAL fully absorbed the A&BAL in 1909. All tunnels on the line were eventually concrete-lined, starting in 1909. The rebuilding of the original E&W line in 1909 also included straightening of curves on the existing trackage which required deep cuts through granite rock, resulting in the removal of over 6 miles of circuitous trackage.

The original SAL Atlanta-Birmingham line was eventually abandoned in 1988 by successor railroad CSX from Cedartown to Wattsville and from Rockmart to Smyrna, Georgia. A large portion of the former right of way from Smyrna to Anniston, Alabama, is now part of the Silver Comet biking and walking trail in Georgia as well as the Chief Ladiga biking and walking trail in Alabama.

References

Defunct Georgia (U.S. state) railroads
Predecessors of the Seaboard Air Line Railroad
Railway companies established in 1903
Railway companies disestablished in 1909
Defunct Alabama railroads
American companies established in 1903
1909 mergers and acquisitions
American companies disestablished in 1909